Chris Jury (born 28 September 1956 in Coventry, Warwickshire) is an English actor, writer and director with a range of television credits. He is best known for his role as Eric Catchpole in the BBC television series Lovejoy, which he played between 1986 (series 1) and 1993 (series 5), with a brief return in 1994 (series 6), for the show's finale.                                

Jury studied Drama/English at Hull University and began working as an actor in the theatre with such names as Mike Bradwell, Danny Boyle and Anthony Minghella, and with companies as diverse as Hull Truck, the Bush and Stratford East.

Having made his name in Lovejoy, Jury was a strong contender to play the Seventh Doctor in Doctor Who in 1987, a role which was ultimately cast with Sylvester McCoy. A year later, Jury appeared as a guest star in the story The Greatest Show in the Galaxy.

Through his own company, Picture That, he produced and directed To Baldly Go, a short romantic comedy which was sold to Channel 4 in the UK, and also secured an international distribution contract, selling to numerous TV stations throughout Europe and the USA. After a brief spell working in drama script development at BBC Pebble Mill, in Birmingham, he made two more short films for Picture That: Poppy's Present, which he produced and directed, and Puke Fiction (The Vomit Trilogy), which he wrote and directed.

Puke Fiction, was shown in competition at the Ritzy Cinema in Brixton and won the Electric Pavilion Award, for Best Film, awarded by the Halloween Society. It was also chosen for a screening at the ICA as part of the 'Uncut' season of short films and was also shown in the 'British Shorts' section of the Manchester Film Festival and the Big Fix Festival in Birmingham.

His broadcast directing credits include Dream Team, Coronation Street, Crossroads, Family Affairs and over 40 episodes of EastEnders.
His writing credits include, The Dig, a two act comedy for the Cambridge Theatre Company, Mancini's Empire, One Inch of Heaven, Roeg's Rage, Wired, plus numerous episodes of The Bill and The Doctors, Casualty and Holby City. He also appeared as teacher Mr Knowles in Grange Hill. In 2006 he moved into writing feature films including Human Resources.

He has lectured on scriptwriting and Film & TV production at the University Of West London, Leeds Metropolitan University, Bath Spa University, Ruskin College Oxford, University Of The Creative Arts. He is currently Creative Director of Public Domain Arts & Media.

He writes for the Morning Star, and the websites Counterfire and Culture Matters. He has been a member of Equity, the Directors Guild of Great Britain (DGGB), Directors UK, University and College Union (UCU) and the Writers' Guild (WGGB). He was founding Chair of the Midlands TUC Creative & Leisure Industries Committee retiring in 2018. Before retiring he had been a member of the National Exec and Chair of the TV Committee of the DGGB, Branch Chair and South West Regional Executive Communications Officer of UCU, and a member of the TV Committee of the WGGB.

References

External links
Official Web Site

1956 births
Living people
Actors from Coventry
Alumni of the University of Hull
English film directors
English male television actors
People from Blockley